Josh Kelly may refer to:

Josh Kelly (actor) (born 1982), American actor
Josh Kelly (Australian footballer) (born 1995), Australian footballer
Josh Kelly (footballer, born 1998), English footballer
Josh Kelly (boxer), British boxer

See also
Josh Kelley (born 1980), American musician
Joshua Kelley (born 1997), American football player